Sheffield (formerly Malvern) is a small village located in the Selwyn District of the Canterbury region of New Zealand's South Island, near the Waimakariri Gorge.

Sheffield has a close association with its neighbouring village Waddington, which is  further south-east along State Highway 73.  The two villages share a community committee.

The two villages are located between Darfield and Springfield on State Highway 73 and the Midland Line railway. The towns were settled in the 19th century by farmers attracted to the area for sheep grazing.

Sheffield has a railway station and was once a railway junction. The first railway line reached the town in the late 1870s from a junction in Darfield with the Whitecliffs Branch. This line, then known as the Malvern Branch line, grew to become the Midland Line between Christchurch and the West Coast. On 28 July 1884, the Oxford Branch was extended over the Waimakariri River to Sheffield, making the town a railway junction. Plans existed to continue this extension south from Sheffield as part of the proposed Canterbury Interior Main Line, but this never came to fruition and the rail link with Oxford closed on 14 July 1930.

Demographics
Sheffield and Waddington are described by Statistics New Zealand as a rural settlement. It is part of the statistical area of Torlesse. 

Sheffield had a population of 192 at the 2018 New Zealand census, an increase of 42 people (28.0%) since the 2013 census, and an increase of 48 people (33.3%) since the 2006 census. There were 72 households. There were 105 males and 84 females, giving a sex ratio of 1.25 males per female. The median age was 38.4 years (compared with 37.4 years nationally), with 39 people (20.3%) aged under 15 years, 33 (17.2%) aged 15 to 29, 96 (50.0%) aged 30 to 64, and 21 (10.9%) aged 65 or older.

Ethnicities were 92.2% European/Pākehā, 6.2% Māori, 3.1% Asian, and 1.6% other ethnicities (totals add to more than 100% since people could identify with multiple ethnicities).

Although some people objected to giving their religion, 59.4% had no religion, 28.1% were Christian, 1.6% were Hindu and 1.6% had other religions.

Of those at least 15 years old, 18 (11.8%) people had a bachelor or higher degree, and 33 (21.6%) people had no formal qualifications. The median income was $34,600, compared with $31,800 nationally. The employment status of those at least 15 was that 84 (54.9%) people were employed full-time, 24 (15.7%) were part-time, and 3 (2.0%) were unemployed.

Government 
Sheffield is part of the  electorate. The Selwyn District Council provides local government services for Sheffield.

Sheffield War Memorial 

The Sheffield community marked 100 years since the end of World War One by planting an oak tree for each of the 20 soldiers from the Sheffield area who lost their lives. The oaks were grown from acorns collected from the Gallipoli Oak which is next to the Bridge of Remembrance in Christchurch.

Saint Ambrose's Anglican Church 

The original church was built in 1878. A decision to replace it occurred in 1939 and work started in 1955, but it was not until 26 August 1962 that it was finally consecrated.

Sheffield Hotel 

Originally built in 1882. In poor shape, the Sheffield Hotel was taken over by new owners in 2014 who revitalised it. The Sheffield Hotel was destroyed by a fire in September 2021. The sole occupant of the hotel was awoken in the middle of the night by smoke alarms and escaped safely.

Education
Sheffield School is a contributing primary school catering for years 1 to 6.

References

Selwyn District
Populated places in Canterbury, New Zealand